Northside School is a public high school located approximately 3 miles southeast of Vernon, Texas (USA). It is part of the Northside Independent School District located in northwestern Wilbarger County. As the school has a Vernon, Texas mailing address, it is often referred to as Vernon Northside. In 2017, the school was rated "Met Standard" by the Texas Education Agency, with a 1-Star Distinction for Academic Achievement in Science.

Athletics
The Northside Indians compete in the following sports:
 Basketball
 Cross Country
 6-Man Football
 Track and Field

State Titles
 Football - In 2006 the Indians defeated Jayton 60–41 in the 1A Six-Man Division 2 championship game to claim their first state title ever.

References

External links
 Northside ISD
 List of Six-man football stadiums in Texas

Schools in Wilbarger County, Texas
Public high schools in Texas
Public middle schools in Texas
Public elementary schools in Texas